This is a list of women artists who were born in Belgium or whose artworks are closely associated with that country.

A
Alix d'Anethan (1849–1921), painter
Berthe Art (1857–1934), painter
Amélie van Assche (born 1804), painter
Amélie van Assche (fl. 1812–1842), painter
Isabelle Catherine van Assche (fl. 1812–1840), landscape painter
Valentine Avoh (fl 2010), fashion designer
Evelyne Axell (1935–1972), pop painter

B
Rachel Baes (1912–1983), surrealist painter
Josette Baujot (1920–2009), comics artist
Maggy Baum (born 1931), fashion designer
Euphrosine Beernaert (1831–1901), painter
Marie de Bièvre (1856–1909), still life painter
Anna Boch (1848–1936), painter
Delphine Boël (born 1968), multimedia artist
Anne Bonnet (1908–1960), painter
Isabelle de Borchgrave (born 1946), artist, sculptor  
Virginie Bovie (1821–1888), painter
Veronique Branquinho (born 1973), fashion designer
Cris Brodahl (born 1963), artist
Anna Francisca de Bruyns (1604–1675), Baroque painter

C
Cécile Cauterman (1882–1957), artist working in charcoal, pencil and pastel
Sophie Cauvin (born 1968), painter
Caroline Chariot-Dayez (born 1958), hyperrealistic painter
May Claerhout (1939–2016), painter
Marie-Lambertine Coclers (1761–after 1815), engraver, pastellist 
Claire Colinet (1880–1950), Belgian-born French sculptor
Marie Collart (1842–1911), painter
Diana Coomans (1861–1952), painter
Heva Coomans (1860–1939), painter
Kitty Crowther (born 1970), illustrator, children's writer
Nine Culliford (1930–2016), comics artist

D
Alix d'Anethan (1848–1921), painter
Marleen Daniels (born 1958), photographer
Louise Danse (1867–1948), etcher, painter
Marie Danse (1866–1942), etcher, painter
Berlinde De Bruyckere (born 1964), painter, sculptor
Anna Francisca de Bruyns (1604–1675), Flemish Baroque painter
Anouk De Clercq (born 1971), multimedia artist
Jos De Cock (1934-2010), painter, water colorist, etcher and sculptor
Louise De Hem (1866–1922), painter 
Marie De Keyser (1815–1879), painter
Éliane de Meuse (1899–1993), painter
Nelly Degouy (1910–1979), painter
Carole Dekeijser (1959–2008), figurative painter
Edith Dekyndt (born 1960), visual artist
Angele Delanghe (born 1971), fashion designer
Élisabeth Delatour (1750–1834), engraver, painter
Princess Delphine of Belgium (born 1968), painter
Ann Demeulemeester (born 1959), fashion designer
Gerda Dendooven (born 1962), illustrator
Jennifer Des (born 1975), photographer
Honorine Deschrijver (1887–1977), fashion designer
Michele Desubleo (1602–1676), Flemish Baroque painter
Marthe Donas (1885–1967), abstract and cubist painter
Cécile Douard (1866–1941), painter, sculptor
Arpaïs Du Bois (born 1973), draughtsman, painter
Lili Dujourie (born 1941), visual artist
Marianne Duvivier (born 1958), comics artist

E
Anneke Eussen (born 1978), drawing, sculpture, photography and installation

F

Maria Faydherbe (1587–1643), Flemish sculptor
Magda Francot (born 1942), painter
Martine Franck (1938–2012), documentary and portrait photographer
Isabella Francken (early 17th century), Flemish painter
Alice Frey (1895–1981), painter
Cindy Frey (born 1975), professional photographer
Suzon Fuks (born 1959), contemporary artist and choreographer

G
Élisa de Gamond (1804–1869), painter
Nathalie Gassel (born 1964), writer and photographer
Fanny Geefs (1807–1883), painter
Ketty Gilsoul-Hoppe (1868–1939), painter
Ingrid Godon (born 1958), illustrator
Nicole Van Goethem (1941–2000), illustrator
Jane Graverol (1905–1984), surrealist painter
Marthe Guillain (1890–1974), painter

H
Jeanne Hebbelynck (1891–1959), illustrator, designer
Catharina van Hemessen (1528–after 1587), Flemish Renaissance painter
Désirée zu Hohenlohe-Langenburg (fl 2013), fashion designer
Francine Holley (1919–2020), painter
Jenny Hoppe (1870–1934), German-Belgian painter
Jeanne Hovine (1888–1992), comics artist
Marie Howet (1897–1984), expressionist painter

I
Ilah (born 1971), comics artist

J
Lucie Jacquart (1852–1956), painter

K
Anna Kernkamp (1868–1947), painter
Claire Kerwin (1919–2005), visual artist 
Marie De Keyser (1815–1879), painter
Sanam Khatibi (born 1979), contemporary artist
Adele Kindt (1804–1884), painter
Magda Kint (born 1936), painter
Solange Knopf (born 1957), visual artist
Aglaia Konrad (born 1960), fine arts photographer

L
Marie-Jo Lafontaine (born 1950), sculptor, video artist

M
Anna Martinowa Zarina (1907–1984), Latvian-born Belgian artist, educator
Marthe Massin (1860–1931), painter
Willia Menzel (1907–1995), sculptor, graphic designer
Fernande de Mertens (1850–1924), Belgian-French painter
Naziha Mestaoui (born 1975), environmental artist 
Georgette Meunier (1859–1951), still life painter
Cécile Miguel (1921–2001), painter
Isabel Miramontes (born 1962), Spanish-Belgian sculptor
Jenny Montigny (1875–1937), painter
Camille van Mulders (1868–1949), still life painter
Betsy Muus (1891–1986), sculptor

N
May Néama (1917–2007), painter, illustrator, sculptor, graphic artist
Suzanne Nijs (1902–1985), sculptor

O
Maria Jacoba Ommeganck (1760–1849), Flemish animal painter

P
Fanny Paelinck-Horgnies (1805–1887), painter
Catharina Peeters (1615–1676), Flemish Baroque painter
Clara Peeters (1594–c.1657), Flemish Baroque painter
Katharina Pepijn (1619–1688), Flemish painter
Cathy Pill (born 1981), fashion designer
Marie-Françoise Plissart (born 1954), photographer and video artist  
Sophie Podolski (1953–1974), poet, graphic artist
Jacqui Poncelet (born 1947), ceramist, painter, sculptor
Marguerite Putsage (1868–1946), painter

R
Adele Renault (born 1988), visual artist, muralist
Alice Ronner (1857–1906), painter
Augusta Roszmann (1859–1945), painter

S
Ann Salens (1940–1994), fashion designer
Yvonne Serruys (1873–1953), painter, sculptor
Elza Severin (1913–1988), illustrator
Marie-Elisabeth Simons, painter

T
Françoise Taylor (1920–2007), engraver
Levina Teerlinc (1510s–1576), painter
Jeanne Tercafs (1898–1944), sculptor 
Maria Theresa van Thielen (1640–1706), Flemish Baroque painter
Kaat Tilley (1959–2012), fashion designer
Ana Torfs (born 1963), contemporary artist
Jeanne Toussaint (1887–1976), Belgian-born French jeweller
Joëlle Tuerlinckx (born 1958), contemporary artist

V
Martha Van Coppenolle (1912–2004), illustrator
Myriam Van Imschoot (born 1969), contemporary artist
Anne-Mie van Kerckhoven (born 1951), contemporary artist
Germaine Van Parys (1893–1983), early photojournalist
Gertruida van Veen (1602–1643), painter
Marguerite Verboeckhoven (1865–1949), painter
Johanna Vergouwen (1630–1714), Flemish Baroque painter
Mayken Verhulst (1518–1599), Flemish miniaturist, watercolour painter
Eva Vermandel (born 1974), photographer
Katrien Vermeire (born 1979), photographer and contemporary artist
Gabrielle Vincent (1928–2000), children's writer, illustrator

W
Monique Watteau (born 1929), painter, illustrator
Michaelina Wautier (1617–1689), Baroque painter
Anna De Weert (1867–1950), painter
Elisabeth Wesmael (1861–1953), graphic artist
Cindy Wright (born 1972), painter
Juliette Wytsman (1866–1925), Impressionist painter

Y
Catarina Ykens-Floquet (1608–after 1666), Flemish still life painter
Catharina Ykens II (born 1659), Flemish still life painter

-
Belgian women artists, List of
Artists
Artists